The Chartrons tram stop came into service on 23 July 2007 on ligne  of the tramway de Bordeaux.

Situation
The station is located on the quay of Chartrons in Bordeaux.

Close by
 Cité du Vin
 Église Saint-Louis
 Skate Park

See also
 TBC
 Tramway de Bordeaux

External links
 

Bordeaux tramway stops
Tram stops in Bordeaux
Railway stations in France opened in 2007